Michel Fanget (born 3 May 1950 in Clermont-Ferrand) is a French politician and a member of the MoDem.

A member of the old Union for French Democracy (UDF), Fanget, an opposition councillor in Clermont-Ferrand was elected deputy for the Puy-de-Dôme's first constituency in the 'blue wave' of the 1993 election. However, he was defeated by the Socialist Odile Saugues in 1997. Fanget also represented the canton of Clermont-Ferrand-Centre from 1994 until he was defeated in 2001.

He joined the MoDem in 2007 and was the party's candidate in Clermont-Ferrand during the 2008 municipal elections.

In 2010, he was selected to be the MoDem's candidate in Auvergne for the 2010 regional elections.

References

1950 births
Living people
Politicians from Clermont-Ferrand
Union for French Democracy politicians
Democratic Movement (France) politicians
Deputies of the 15th National Assembly of the French Fifth Republic
Regional councillors of Auvergne-Rhône-Alpes